The 1960 Utah Redskins football team was an American football team that represented the University of Utah as a member of the Skyline Conference during the 1960 NCAA University Division football season. In their third season under head coach Ray Nagel, the Redskins compiled an overall record of 7–3 with a mark of 5–1 against conference opponents, placing third in the Skyline. Home games were played on campus at Ute Stadium in Salt Lake City.

Utah was led on the field by senior quarterback Terry Nofsinger.

Conference foe New Mexico was not played in 1960, so Utah finished a half game behind co-champions Utah State and Wyoming in the standings. The Redskins denied the undefeated Aggies an outright title and a perfect regular season with a 6–0 shutout in the conference finale on November 19 in Salt Lake City. For the second straight year, Utah did not face longtime rival Colorado; the teams met in 1961 and 1962, then the series went on hiatus until 2011, when both schools joined the Pac-12 Conference.

Schedule

NFL Draft
Utah had two players selected in the 1961 NFL Draft.

References

Utah
Utah Utes football seasons
Utah Redskins football